Juliana Castro may refer to:

 Juliana Castro (footballer) (born 1991), Uruguayan footballer
 Juliana Castro (volleyball) (born 1985), Brazilian volleyball player
 Juliana Castro (designer) (born 1992), Colombian graphic designer